Darko Vargec (Serbian Cyrillic: Дарко Варгец; born 1 August 1972) is a retired Serbian footballer that was for many years the team captain of the 1997–98 Yugoslav champions FK Obilić.

Honours
Obilić
First League of FR Yugoslavia Champion: 1997-98

External links
 Obilic 97-98 team with players profiles
 Profile in Dekisa.Tripod with stats until 2003

Living people
1972 births
Footballers from Novi Sad
Serbian footballers
Serbian football managers
RFK Novi Sad 1921 players
FK Obilić players
Association football defenders